Amruta Patki (16 August 1985) is an Indian super model and former beauty queen. She won Femina Miss India 2006, subsequently winning the Femina Miss India Earth title and representing India at the Miss Earth 2006 pageant. There she finished as a 1st runners up, attaining the title of Miss Earth Air 2006.

Currently, Patki works as a model, actor, anchor and grooming expert. She made her acting début in the 2010 Bollywood film Hide & Seek.
Her Marathi début film as a female lead Satya Savitri Satyavan released in July 2012.
She was also nominated during the Radio Mirchi Music Awards 2012 as a début singer for Madalasa, the promotional song of her Marathi film. Patki is an adventure enthusiast and an amateur pilot.

Amruta married a stock broker Jyotindra Kanekar from Pune in January 2017 and now lives in Singapore. She completed her graduate program in counselling psychology and works as a professional Counsellor.

Filmography

External links
 
 "Neha Kapur is new Femina Miss India" – NDTV.com article dated 18 March 2006
 A mini Biography: (Archived 2009-10-25)
 Official Miss Earth bio

Living people
Female models from Mumbai
Femina Miss India winners
Miss Earth 2006 contestants
Miss Earth India delegates
Marathi people
1985 births